The Steel City Menace were a professional indoor football team and a member of American Indoor Football that played part of the 2016 season.  Originally based in Pueblo, Colorado, the Menace were to play their home games at the Southwest Motors Events Center, however, they ended up playing at an outdoor field and the two regular season league games they played were on the road.

The Menace were the second indoor football team to call Pueblo home, after the Pueblo Pistols which played in the National Indoor Football League for the 2007 season before the team and the league folded.

Originally, the Menace were going to be known as the Mile High Menace and play at the Magness Arena in Denver.

During their first exhibition home game at West Texas, they wore a local high school's uniform (Centennial High School). The team folded mid-season after two league road games and not having a home arena. The head coach, Terry Foster, left the team to coach the Myrtle Beach Freedom on April 19, 2016.

Roster

Staff

Statistics and records

Season results

Head coaches' records

2016 season

Key:

Exhibition games
All start times were local to home team

Regular season
All start times were local to home team

Standings

References

External links
Steel City Menace official website
American Indoor Football official website

American Indoor Football teams
American football teams in Colorado
Defunct indoor American football teams
Sports in Pueblo, Colorado
American football teams established in 2015
American football teams disestablished in 2016
2015 establishments in Colorado
2016 disestablishments in Colorado